The Floridian may refer to:

Hotels
Disney's Grand Floridian Resort & Spa, a hotel on International Drive, Orlando, Florida
The Floridian (Hong Kong), a residential building in Quarry Bay, Hong Kong
Floridian Hotel, a hotel in Miami, Florida

Newspapers
The Floridian, former newspaper in Pensacola, Florida
The Floridian, also the Weekly Floridian, former newspaper in Tallahassee from 1828 (List of newspapers in Florida)
The Floridian, originally the Jewish Floridian in Miami established 1927 (List of newspapers in Florida)

Other uses
Floridian (train), a former inter-city train between Chicago and Miami